Diacrisia echo is a moth of the family Erebidae. It was described by Walter Rothschild in 1910. It is found in Asia.

References

Arctiina
Moths described in 1910